Dimbelenge is a city of the Democratic Republic of the Congo.  It is located in Kasaï-Central. As of 2012, it had an estimated population of 3,990.

References 

Populated places in Kasaï-Central